Wahroonga railway station is a heritage-listed railway station located on the North Shore line, serving the Sydney suburb of Wahroonga. The station is located in the Ku-ring-gai Council local government area of New South Wales, Australia. It is served by Sydney Trains T1 North Shore line services. It was built from 1890 to 1910 by E. Pritchard & Co., contractor (first 1890 line). It is also known as Wahroonga Railway Station group and Pearce's Corner; Noonan's Platform. The property was added to the New South Wales State Heritage Register on 2 April 1999.

History
The meaning of "Wahroonga" – an Aboriginal word – is "our home".

In May 2022, an upgrade to the station was opened including a new lift and accessible toilet, while the Redleaf Avenue bridge was also refurbished.

Development of Wahroonga
George Caley (1770–1829) a botanist who had been sent to the colony in 1795 by Sir Joseph Banks from London to collect flora specimens for Kew Gardens, was one of the first white men to explore this bushland area. In 1805 he walked along a cattle path on the ridge towards Fox Valley, near the 640 acres that were later granted to Thomas Hyndes by Governor Darling (1825–31). The north-western part of the grant, known later as Pearce's Corner extended past the present Sydney Adventist Hospital (today this area marks the boundary of three suburbs: Normanhurst, Waitara and Wahroonga) – and honours an early settler whose name was Aaron Pierce. He arrived with his wife in 1811, received a conditional pardon and worked as a timber cutter along the ridge from Kissing Point to the present Pacific Highway (formerly Lane Cove Road). Three tracks converged at this point and Pierce built a hut to house his family and set out an orchard. He was said to reside there by 1831, and the corner was then known as Pierce's Corner). A village developed on the opposite corner (Pearce's Corner Township, later renamed Normanhurst)) around St. Paul's Church (which today is in Wahroonga).

On Hyndes' death the grant was bought by John Brown and became known as Brown's Paddock. When he died in 1881, it was resurveyed and the larger portion became Fox Ground Estate, purchased by a Francis Gerard.

The harbour barrier delayed the suburbanisation of the Ku-ring-gai district and in the early 1880s the tiny settlement was judged too small to warrant a railway line. Access to Milsons Point remained difficult although a coach service plied that route from 1881 to 1887. By 1885 it was also possible to travel to Sydney via the five bridges road crossing the water at Fig Tree, Gladesville, Iron Cove, Glebe Island and Pyrmont.

The post office opened on 15 October 1896. In 1898 Abbotsleigh School for girls moved to Wahroonga. In 1899 when only 3 houses stood in Fox Valley Road, Wahroonga, the Seventh-Day Adventists purchased land there and erected a large building by 1903. This evolved into "The San" or Sanitarium hospital.

During the interwar years of 1921 to 1933, the population increased by 45 per cent from 19,209 to 27,931 with a 68 per cent rise in the number of occupied dwellings, the proportion of brick to weatherboard being 5:1. The same sort of increase occurred from 1933 to 1947 when a further 43 per cent of people moved into the district bringing the total population to 39,874 and adding 3,564 houses. Even greater restriction on the use of timber and fibro occurred in this period so that 3,182 of these were brick. Clearly, Ku-ring-gai suffered less in the 1930s depression than other municipalities where development was much slower. Its people also encountered less unemployment – only slightly behind Vaucluse with 16 per cent unemployed, Ku-ring-gai and Mosman registered 18 per cent unemployed in 1933 – although the proportion of owner occupation did fall to 68 per cent.

The first public school in Wahroonga opened in January 1944.

Establishment of the Wahroonga railway station
Railway and tramway plans for the area were discussed by the authorities in the 1880s.

Wahroonga station opened on 1 January 1890 as Pearce's Corner when the North Shore line opened from Hornsby to St Leonards. It was renamed Wahroonga on 30 August 1890.

The single-track North Shore railway line that went from Hornsby to St Leonards in 1890 finally reached Milsons Point in 1893. The North Shore Ferry Company had been carrying passengers from Milsons Point to Circular Quay since the 1860s and by the 1890s around 5 million people crossed the harbour by this means every year. Offering suburban subdivisions along the railway line in advance of the stations, speculators developed Ku-ring-gai well before completion of the North Shore Bridge in 1932 set off another flurry of real estate promotion. Ku-ring-gai grew slowly in the 19th century, its population being 4,000 by 1901. However, over the next two decades its population quadrupled. By this time, with its large residences in beautiful, leafy surrounds, it had changed from a district with a dubious reputation to one that attracted people of high socio-economic status, 73 per cent of whom were home owners.

When the railway line came through the North Shore from St. Leonards to Hornsby, a station opened in this area on 1 January 1890 and was called Pearce's Corner. The construction name had been Noonan's Platform because the property belonging to Patrick Noonan came within the new railway's boundary. The name was changed to Wahroonga on 30 August 1890. The section between Hornsby and St. Leonards was built by E. Pritchard & Co. contractor.

A short brick faced platform and small timber building stood on the south side of the single line. This was south of a level crossing with then Noonan's Road, later renamed Coonanbarra Road. The station name was changed to Wahroonga on 30 October 1890.

24 October 1901 Pymble News reported "trees have been planted on the sides of the station.  This work will add immeasurably to the attractions of Wahroonga in the eyes of visitors to the Railway Station.". These trees were Californian desert fan palms (Washingtonia robusta).

The present station building at Wahroonga, together with the road bridge over the line and pedestrian steps at Redleaf Avenue was provided about 1906 in anticipation of the double line. A duplicated line was completed in May 1909 and the 12 mile section between Hornsby and Milson's Point was opened in early 1910. Island platforms were part of the duplication arrangements. The booking/station master's office is located in the platform building at the Sydney end adjacent to two ticket issuing windows. The pedestrian footbridge at Coonanbarra Road was built at this time when the level crossing was closed.

A new road overbridge was built on the southern end of the platform and this replaced the level crossing at the north of the station. Access to the new island platform was via a set of steps from the new overbridge. Train services continued to be steam-hauled on this line until c.1927 when alterations allowed for electrification of the line between Milson's Point and Hornsby. Automatic colour light signalling was installed between Lindfield and Hornsby (including Wahroonga) on 8 May 1928. Steam trains were withdrawn in July 1928. When the Sydney Harbour Bridge was opened on 20 March 1932, the North Shore train services connected with the rest of the Sydney suburban railway system.

The 1926 Wahroonga Progress Association's Annual Report stated the railway station garden "for 9 years in succession, with one exception, has gained first prize in the competition for privately maintained railway station gardens".

A pair of brick entrance piers were built at the foot of the pedestrian steps with timber covering in the mid-1930s, similar to the set at Killara, since demolished.

Possibly in the 1920s or 1930s Hill's fig trees (Ficus microcarpa var. Hillii) were planted on the island platform, replacing the earlier fan palm trees. Appropriate shrubs and trees have been planted in the centre line of the platform on both sides of the centrally located building since its earliest days. These are well cared for and add to the stylish setting of the station.

In early years, Old Milson's Point, Bay Road, St. Leonards, Chatswood, Lindfield, Gordon, Pymble, Turramurra, Wahroonga and Hornsby Stations had goods yards. All but St. Leonards, Chatswood and Hornsby yards had disappeared by the mid-twentieth century, and the latter three did not survive into the late twentieth century. Grounds on the east and west of the tracks are also densely planted with a mixture of native and exotic trees and shrubs. These are maintained by Hornsby Shire Council. In 2009 the Hill's fig trees on the platform were replaced with blue berry ash (Elaeocarpus reticulatus) as the figs' roots were lifting pavement and causing trip and risk hazards. The new trees have a more upright, narrow habit which should suit the constricted corridor between the railway overhead power lines. The platform upgrade include relocation of seats and re-paving of the platform surface.

Description

Landscape

What is significant about the route is the fact that the topography is steep, rising from near sea level at Kirribilli and Lavender Bay.

It is set in a cutting with elevated road and pedestrian bridges over this, connecting Wahroonga to its east and west. The main shopping centre is on its eastern side, flanked by Redleaf Park. The station and its surroundings are a superb example of the early 1900s Sydney suburban railway station architecture and design, set among gardens lovingly tended by the Ku-ring-gai Council and local residents. Until the time of the listing, (1999) the whole of the station platform, building, steps and overhead bridge were virtually unchanged from the time each unit was built.

The landscape includes:
 the whole of the station area as landscape precinct as part of larger landscape precinct in Wahroonga area
 brick walls, 1909
 1910s – plantings to platform area and gardens around station area.

Trees (five Hill's fig trees (Ficus microcarpa var.'Hillii') and some shrubs are planted on the island platform give added importance to the pleasant visual appearance. These have been well cared for by State Rail and council staff. Their presence is unique on this line and unusual in a railway setting due to the difficulty in easy maintenance where road access is not available. They date to the 1910s as evidenced in photographs.

Appropriate shrubs and trees have been planted in the centre line of the platform on both sides of the centrally located building since its earliest days. These are well cared for and add to the stylish setting of the station.

Grounds on the east and west of the tracks are also densely planted with a mixture of native and exotic trees and shrubs. These are maintained by Ku-Ring-Gai Shire Council. There is a dense mixed planting on the eastern side's grounds. This includes the unusual large shrub, horned holly (Ilex cornuta), native cypress/Port Jackson pine (Callitris columellaris), strawberry tree (Arbutus unedo), a rare rainforest tree, the Davidson plum (Davidsonia pruriens), Camellia japonica cv.s and laurustinus (Viburnum tinus). The western side grounds plantings include a tall swamp cypress (Taxodium distichum) and a hoop pine (Araucaria cunninghamii).

Buildings
station building – type 11, initial island/side building brick, 1906

Structures
 platform faces – brick, 1906
 brick arch overbridge, 1909
 steps – steel fabricated down end, c. 1900
 pedestrian footbridge at North end of station

The station building is representative of a high quality of railway station building which was to be found elsewhere on the north shore railway line, but the environment at Wahroonga places it in a much higher category due to the complementary gardens and trees.

A footbridge across the northern end of the platform (but giving no access to it) leading to and from both sides of the Coonanbarra Road, is unusual for the Sydney suburban area. Plans have been made to construct a set of access stairs from this bridge to the platform.

The overbridge carrying Redleaf Avenue over the line at the southern end consists of concrete arches over each railway track supported by brick piers carrying the road over the railway line and brick abutments on the footpaths above and early example of this construction in Sydney.

The station complements the small shopping centre and office buildings in the surrounding streets on the southern side of the line. Two ticket collecting booths in brick stand at the foot of the Redleaf Avenue stairs dating from the 1930s and are unusual to the north shore line.

Condition 

As at 14 January 2009, until the time of the listing, the whole of the station platform, building, steps and overhead bridge were virtually unchanged from the time each unit was built.

The spacing of the new trees respects a range of issues including avoiding disturbed sub-platform areas. In early years, Old Milson's Point, Bay Road, St. Leonards, Chatswood, Lindfield, Gordon, Pymble, Turramurra, Wahroonga and Hornsby Stations had goods yards. All but St. Leonards, Chatswood and Hornsby yards had disappeared by the mid-twentieth century, and the latter three did not survive into the late twentieth century.

Modifications and dates 
1890: the first station opened. A short brick faced platform and small timber building stood on the south side of the single line. This was south of a level crossing with then Noonan's Road, later renamed Coonanbarra Road.
c. 1900 steps – steel fabricated down end
1906 platform faces – brick
 The present building, together with the road bridge over the line and pedestrian steps at Redleaf Avenue was provided about 1906 in anticipation of the double line. The booking/station master's office is located in the platform building at the Sydney end adjacent to two ticket issuing windows. The pedestrian footbridge at Coonanbarra Road was built at this time when the level crossing was closed. Appropriate shrubs and trees have been planted in the centre line of the platform on both sides of the centrally located building since its earliest days, .
1909 brick arch overbridge
1930s A pair of brick entrance piers were built at the foot of the pedestrian steps with timber covering, similar to Killara's, since demolished.
1982 SRA sealed the platform with bitumen, causing one Hill's fig tree's death and another needed much attention
2001+ Replace and raise height of bridge deck

Platforms and services

Transport links
Transdev NSW operates one route to and from Wahroonga station:
576: to North Wahroonga

Wahroonga station is served by one NightRide route:
N90: Hornsby station to Town Hall station

Heritage listing 
As at 29 May 2008, Wahroonga station is one of the best island platform buildings on the north shore line. As a group they provide a consistent style of high significance as all are in excellent condition, and display a unity of development rarely seen on the railway system. They are also of interest as they are all island platform structures except for the terminus points such as Lindfield and Gordon where and additional platform is provided. This station contributes an important part as a major transport outlet for residents. It is sited in a garden setting which was typical of many stations throughout the State and many of which now have largely been removed. This gives the site added significance.

Wahroonga railway station was listed on the New South Wales State Heritage Register on 2 April 1999 having satisfied the following criteria.

The place possesses uncommon, rare or endangered aspects of the cultural or natural history of New South Wales.

This item is assessed as historically rare. This item is assessed as arch. rare. This item is assessed as socially rare.

See also 

List of railway stations in Sydney

References

Bibliography

Attribution

External links

Wahroonga station details Transport for New South Wales

Railway stations in Sydney
Railway stations in Australia opened in 1890
New South Wales State Heritage Register
Wahroonga, New South Wales
Articles incorporating text from the New South Wales State Heritage Register
North Shore railway line